Otocarpus is a genus of flowering plants belonging to the family Brassicaceae.

Its native range is Algeria.

Species:
 Otocarpus virgatus Durieu

References

Brassicaceae
Brassicaceae genera